Boris Psaker (born January 25, 1955) is a Croatian former footballer who played in the National Soccer League, North American Soccer League, and the American Soccer League.

Career 
Psaker was a product of the Dinamo Zagreb academy system. In 1970, he played abroad in the National Soccer League with Toronto Croatia from 1970 till 1974. In 1974, he featured in the NSL Championship final against Toronto Homer, and contributed the winning goal for Croatia. In 1975, he made the transition to the North American Soccer League by signing with Toronto Metros-Croatia. He returned to Toronto Croatia for the 1977 season, and assisted in securing their spot in the NSL First division.

In 1979, he played in the Southwestern Ontario Soccer League with Windsor Croatia. During the off season he  played indoor soccer with the Detroit Express, where he appeared in four matches. In 1981, he played in the American Soccer League with New York Eagles.

Honors 
Toronto Croatia
 NSL Championship: 1974

References 

1955 births
Living people
Association football forwards
Yugoslav footballers
Toronto Croatia players
Toronto Blizzard (1971–1984) players
Detroit Express players
New York Eagles players
Canadian National Soccer League players
North American Soccer League (1968–1984) players
American Soccer League (1933–1983) players
Yugoslav expatriate footballers
Expatriate soccer players in Canada
Yugoslav expatriate sportspeople in Canada
Expatriate soccer players in the United States
Yugoslav expatriate sportspeople in the United States